The Hwasong-7 (spelled Hwaseong-7 in South Korea, lit. Mars Type 7), also known as Nodong-1, is a single-stage, mobile liquid propellant medium-range ballistic missile developed by North Korea. Developed in the mid-1980s, it is a scaled up adaptation of the Soviet R-17 Elbrus missiles, more commonly known by its NATO reporting name "Scud". Inventory is estimated to be around 200–300 missiles. US Air Force National Air and Space Intelligence Center estimates that as of June 2017 fewer than 100 launchers were operationally deployed.

One variant Rodong-1M is called Hwasong-9.

It influenced the design of Pakistan's Ghauri-1 missile, as well as the Iranian Shahab-3.

Overview

It is believed North Korea obtained R-17 designs from Egypt, and possibly modified designs from China, allowing them to reverse-engineer them into a larger and longer-distance weapon. United States reconnaissance satellites first detected this type in May 1990 at the Musudan-ri test launch facility, in northeastern North Korea.

The precise capabilities and specifications of the missile are unknown; even the fact of its production and deployment are controversial.

Its aerodynamic design is stable, reducing the need for modern active stabilization systems while the missile is flying in the denser lower atmosphere. It can only be fueled when vertical, therefore it cannot be fueled before transport as is normal for modern missiles. Its range is estimated as 900 km (960 mi) with a 1,000 kg payload to a range of between 1,000 km to 1,500 km. North Korea test-fired three Hwasong-7 missiles consecutively on 5 September 2016 and they all flew for about 1000 km, landing in the Japan air defense identification zone.

It has an estimated circular error probable (CEP) of one or two kilometers. North Korea is believed to possess some 300 Hwasong-7 missiles and fewer than 50 mobile launchers.

The Hwasong-7's technology has been exported to foreign nations (such as Iran and Pakistan) in secrecy on the basis of mutual exchange of technologies, with Iran being one of the largest beneficiaries of such technology. Successful variants were tested and deployed by Iran after developing the Shahab-3 which is roughly based on Hwasong-7.

Pakistan, however, suffered with repeated failure initially due to flawed design  given in exchange but succeeded in reevaluating the missile's conceptual design and its electronic system in 1998 through reverse engineering. The Ghauri (missile) was later (independently) developed by Kahuta Research Labs and eventually entered in to active military service in 2003.It is believed that it is redesigned/ reverse engineered model of Rodong-1.

A few Hwasong-7 missiles were launched in the 2006 North Korean missile test, and a further two in a 2014 test over a range of 650 km.

Their range was shortened by firing at a higher launch angle. The missiles flew to an altitude of 160 km (100 mi) at Mach 7. U.S. and South Korean Patriot PAC-2/3 interceptors are more specialized to hit ballistic missiles missiles up to 40 km high.

On 5 September 2016, North Korea fired three consecutive Rodong-1 missiles into the Sea of Japan and at a range of about 1,000 km. This marked the Rodong-1 as a credible and matured missile suitable for operational deployment since its first successful launch in 1993. The United Nations Security Council condemned North Korea's missile launches.

To enable interception at higher altitudes, South Korea is indigenously developing the long-range surface-to-air missile (L-SAM), and on 8 July 2016 the U.S. agreed to deploy one Terminal High Altitude Area Defense missile defense system in Seongju County, in the south of South Korea, by the end of 2017.

See also
 Strategic Rocket Forces (North Korea)
 North Korean missile tests
 North Korean defense industry
 Military of North Korea

References

External links
 CSIS Missile Threat - No-Dong 1
 CNS report North Korea's Ballistic Missile Capabilities 2006
 Center for Nonproliferation Studies, North Korea's Ballistic Missile Program
 GlobalSecurity.org, Nodong-1
 National Threat Initiative, Nodong: Overview and Technical Assessment

Ballistic missiles of North Korea
Medium-range ballistic missiles
Medium-range ballistic missiles of North Korea
Military equipment introduced in the 1990s